Gustave Greystone-Meissner House, also known as Greystone and Evergreen Hill, is a historic home and national historic district located near Pevely, Jefferson County, Missouri.  Greystone was built about 1845, and is a two-story, asymmetrical plan, Gothic Revival style frame dwelling. It sits on a limestone block foundation and measures 48 feet, 1 1/2 inches, wide and 39 feet, 1 inch deep.  It has a steeply pitched gable roof with dormers and features Carpenter Gothic wood cut-work, finials and drops.  Also on the property is the contributing Gustave Meissner House. It was built in 1875, and is  -story, "L"-shaped, frame dwelling with a steeply pitched cross-gable roof.

It was listed on the National Register of Historic Places in 1974.

References

External links

Historic American Buildings Survey in Missouri
Historic districts on the National Register of Historic Places in Missouri
Houses on the National Register of Historic Places in Missouri
Gothic Revival architecture in Missouri
Houses completed in 1845
Houses completed in 1875
Buildings and structures in Jefferson County, Missouri
National Register of Historic Places in Jefferson County, Missouri